Anotylus latiusculus is a species of rove beetle widely spread in Asia.

Description
It is a tiny, spiny-legged rove beetle with a length of 1.5 mm. The body is black and shiny with a small head. Dorsal surfaces of head, thorax and elytra are sparsely pitted. Antenna clubbed. Elytra short. There is a row of spines in front tibia.

It is a parasitoid of Musca domestica that attack the puparium.

Two subspecies were identified.

 Anotylus latiusculus latiusculus - nominate
 Anotylus latiusculus niticeps (Bernhauer, 1935)

References 

Staphylinidae
Insects of Sri Lanka
Insects of India
Insects described in 1859